is a Japanese manufacturer of chemicals, fibers and other materials. Their main manufacturing facilities are located in Kurashiki, Okayama.  The company's Tokyo administrative offices are located in Otemachi, Chiyoda  in the Ote Center Building and its Osaka offices are located in the Umeda Hankyu Building). , Kuraray was the sole worldwide producer of Vectran liquid crystal polymer (LCP) fibre.

The company is listed in the first section of Tokyo Stock Exchange and is a member of the Nikkei 225 stock market index.

Kuraray is a member of the Mizuho keiretsu.

History 
In April 2015, Kuraray acquired the Australian manufacturer of biobased barrier films Plantic Technologies. In September 2017, Kuraray acquired Calgon Carbon for $1.1 billion, an activated carbon maker based in Pittsburgh. In February 2021, Kuraray signed the global framework of the United Nations Global Compact.

Product Offerings
Various products are described below:

Clarino
 EVAL
 Felibendy (nonwoven fabric of Sophista composite fiber, see below)
 Genestar
 MOWIOL
 MOWIFLEX
 MOWITAL / PIOLOFORM
 KURARAY POVAL
 Septon
 Sophista (fiber: polyester core, ethylene vinyl alcohol-coated)
Vectran
 Butacite® / TROSIFOL brand polyvinyl butyral

Gallery

Incidents 
In May 2018, an explosion occurred in Kuraray's Pasadena plant in the US, injuring 21 workers. The plant is the world's largest ethylene vinyl alcohol plant. Kuraray agreed to pay a total of $92 million in settlement to the affected employees. In September 2019, a plasticizer leaked from Kuraray's plant in Fayetteville to the Cape Fear River, forcing the Brunswick County to stop drawing water from the river.

References

External links

 Official global website 
 Kuraray America, Inc. 
 Kuraray Europe GmbH

 
Chemical companies based in Tokyo
Textile companies of Japan
Companies listed on the Tokyo Stock Exchange
Japanese companies established in 1926
Chemical companies established in 1926
Companies based in Osaka Prefecture